Michael Barry (born 18 December 1975) is a Canadian author and former professional road racing cyclist. Barry raced for numerous world-class teams with the role of 'domestique'. His greatest personal successes were placing eighth in the 2008 Beijing Olympics' road race, finishing second in the Canadian National Road Race Championships in 2001 and 2012, and winning a stage of the Tour of Missouri in 2008. He announced his retirement in September 2012, stating that the 2012 Tour of Beijing would be his last race. He is also an author who has written three books.

Career
He was born and raised in Toronto, Ontario. His father, Michael (Mike) Barry Sr., was a racer himself in England in the 1950s, who until 2006 ran a specialty bike store and manufactured a line of hand-made bicycle frames under his own Mariposa brand. As a result, the younger Barry grew up in a cycling-intense environment, and started racing at a very young age. He has been a professional since 1998. He has spent many years on the Canadian National Team during the early years of his career. His wife is 2004 Olympic Silver Medalist Dede Demet Barry. They have 2 children.

Previous to riding for UCI ProTour team  Barry spent several years with the  team. He also raced with the Saturn Cycling Team for a number of years before going to US Postal Service/Discovery.

Barry has raced in 5 Vuelta a Españas and 5 Giro d'Italias but in 2007 had to abandon the Giro due to health issues, which put him out most of the season. He also had to pull out of the 2002 Vuelta a España after colliding with a motorcycle on the eight stage.

The work contains texts authored by some of his team mates, including George Hincapie. When the doping topic arises in the book, Barry vehemently denies having ever witnessed any drug intake in the team. He and his wife also wrote a training book. He also writes diary entries during his cycling season. His third book, Le Metier, detailing the life of a cycling domestique, was published in 2010 by Rouleur.

He is generally considered a support rider, or domestique, helping the team leaders win races, but he will often get the opportunity to go for personal results. He is usually the team leader for Canada for the World Championships. His strengths lie in the time-trial, and hilly road races. He can be counted on for grand tours, and other stage races as well.

On 24 June 2010, Team Sky announced that Barry would be part of its 2010 Tour de France team. This would be Barry's first Tour de France appearance after thirteen seasons as a professional.

On 5 September 2012, Barry announced he would retire at the end of the season, after his last race, October's Tour of Beijing.

Doping
On 10 October 2012 it was announced by USADA that he would be suspended for six months for admissions of doping during his time with the US Postal Cycling Team. Later that day a statement was released confirming his acceptance of a six-month ban from 1 September 2012 ending on 1 March 2013 along with a stripping of all race results between  13 May 2003 and 31 July 2006. He confessed that the US Postal team and he were using an extensive amount of performance-enhancing drugs.

Highlights
Highlights include:
 Stage win at the 2008 Tour of Missouri
 Placed 9th in the men's road race at the 2008 Beijing Olympics
 Placing 4th overall in the 2003 Tour de Georgia
 At the 2006 Tour of Flanders, Barry went down extremely hard in a crash, suffering severe facial cuts and lacerations and also fracturing some vertebrae.

Major results

1997
 1st  National Under-23 Road Race Championships
1999
 2nd First Union Invitational
 4th Overall Ringerike GP
 8th Overall GP de Beauce
 10th Overall Tour Trans-Canada
2000
 5th Overall Ringerike GP
 6th Overall Redlands Classic
2001
 2nd National Road Race Championships
 2nd BMC San Francisco GP
 4th Overall Peace Race
 4th Overall GP de Beauce
 7th Samsung Classic
 7th First Union Invitational
2002
 1st Stage 1 TTT Volta a Catalunya
 6th First Union Invitational
 9th Road Race Commonwealth Games
2003
4th Overall Tour de Georgia

2003
 7th World Championships Road Race
2004
 1st Stage 1 TTT Vuelta a España
2005
 6th Overall Tour of Austria
1st Stage 1
1st  Points Classification
2006
2nd Eindhoven Team Time Trial

2007
 3rd Overall Sachsen Tour
2008
 5th Overall Tour of Ireland
 8th Olympic Road Race
 10th Overall Tour of Missouri
1st Stage 4
Most Aggressive Rider Award  for Stage 4
2009
 1st Stage 1 TTT Giro d'Italia
  Most Aggressive Rider Award Tour of Missouri
2012
 2nd National Road Race Championships

References

Further reading

External links
Profile on VELOBIOS
Michael Barry Official Website

Bicycle Times - Drinks With: Mike and Michael Barry of Mariposa Bicycles
PAVED Magazine - 5 Reasons Why She’s Dede Demet Barry And You’re Not
PAVED Magazine - Finding Tommy Boy

Canadian male cyclists
Canadian memoirists
Canadian sportspeople in doping cases
Cyclists from Ontario
Cyclists at the 1996 Summer Olympics
Cyclists at the 2004 Summer Olympics
Cyclists at the 2008 Summer Olympics
Canadian people of English descent
Olympic cyclists of Canada
Doping cases in cycling
Sportspeople from Toronto
1975 births
Living people
Cyclists at the 2002 Commonwealth Games
Commonwealth Games competitors for Canada